Virginia Gómez (born 26 February 1991) is an Argentine footballer who plays as a right back for Rosario Central and the Argentina women's national team.

International career
Gómez represented Argentina at the 2008 FIFA U-20 Women's World Cup. At senior level, she made her debut on 28 February 2019 in a 0–5 friendly loss against South Korea.

References

1991 births
Living people
Women's association football fullbacks
Women's association football midfielders
Argentine women's footballers
Footballers from Rosario, Santa Fe
Argentina women's international footballers
2019 FIFA Women's World Cup players
Pan American Games silver medalists for Argentina
Pan American Games medalists in football
Footballers at the 2019 Pan American Games
Rosario Central (women) players
Medalists at the 2019 Pan American Games